Hoshangabad (officially Narmadapuram) is a city and municipality in the Indian state of Madhya Pradesh. It serves as the headquarters of both Narmadapuram district and Narmadapuram division. It is located in central India, on the south bank of the Narmada River.

History
The city was earlier called Narmadapur after the Narmada river. Later the name was changed to Hoshangabad after Hoshang Shah Gori, the first ruler of Malwa Sultanate. Hoshangabad district was part of the Nerbudda (Narmada) Division of the Central Provinces and Berar, which became the state of Madhya Bharat (later Madhya Pradesh) after India's independence in 1947.

The city is famous for its beautiful ghats along the banks of the Narmada river, Sethani ghat is a major attraction. There are colourful celebrations in the city on Narmada Jayanti. During celebrations this year the CM announced the efforts to rename the town. A Satsang Bhavan on the ghat has regular visits by Hindu saints who hold regular religious discourses on Ramcharitmanas and Gita.

The city was renamed to Narmadapuram in March 2021.

Geography

Topography
Northern boundary of the district is river Narmada. Across this the district of Raisen and Sehore lies. The district of Betul lies in the south, whereas the Harda district faces with the western and south-western boundaries and Narsingpur and Chhindwara districts, close to the north-eastern and south-eastern sides of the district respectively.

Climate
The climate of Hoshangabad district is typically that of Central India. Being close to the Tropic of Cancer, there is a hot, dry summer with maximum temperature of 40 - 42 degrees Celsius (April - June). This is followed by the monsoons with copious rainfall. The winters are dry and mild (November to February).

Demographics

As of the 2011 Census of India, Hoshangabad has a population of 117,988; including 61,716 males and 56,272 females. It has an average literacy rate of 87.01%, higher than the national average: male literacy is 91.79%, and female literacy is 81.79%.

Economy
The economy largely depends on agriculture.Hoshangabad is one of the largest producer of Soya Bean. The land is quite fertile and farmers have good canal irrigation facilities from the Tawa reservoir throughout the year. The farmers employ rotation of crops and their major income depends on soya bean and wheat.

The city has a traditional way of living with many engaged in occupations enough for sustaining life. The city has abundant availability of water. Hoshangabad has high income per capita amongst cities of Madhya Pradesh.

Famous industrial establishment in Naramadapuram is the Security Papers Mill, a unit of Printing and Minting Corporation of India Ltd. The main trade in the district are handicraft, silk, leather, pulses etc. Other than these, the main business deals in the delivering of sand and tiles which come from river Narmada.

Culture/Cityscape

Landmarks 
Sethani ghat is an important landmark of the city, on the banks of River Narmada.

Nearby attractions 
 Sethani ghat—This is an old ghat built on the bank of river Narmada. Many temples are near it.
 Ancient petroglyphs on Adamgarh hills consist of petroglyphs (rock paintings); it is a site of national importance; it is two kilometres away from the main city.
 Bandhrabhan—a holy fair takes place every year at Bandhrabhan, as it is a meeting point of the main rivers Narmada and Tawa.
 Salkanpur—Goddess Durga temple approximate  from Hoshangabad. It can be reached via Budni or from the Bhopal-NasurullaGanj route. The deity, Ma Durga Beejasan is held in high esteem by her followers & local. Thousands of people visit this place everyday climbing more than 1000 steps. Every year a grand fair is held in salkanpur during Navratris. It is very old Temple but at present temple renovate by Salkanpur Trust.
 Hushang Shah Fort—This is an old fort built by the Malwa ruler Hoshang Shah. It is adjacent to river Narmada.
 TAWA Resort—Tawa Reservoir is a large reservoir on the Tawa River in central India. It is located in Hoshangabad District of Madhya Pradesh state. The reservoir was formed by the construction of the Tawa Dam, which began in 1958 and was completed in 1978. The dam provides for irrigation to several thousand hectares of farming land in Hoshangabad and Harda districts. It is also a big tourist attraction during the monsoon months. A Cruise boat service has been started by the tourism department for visitors to the dam and reservoir.
kalimandir gwaltoli—In Hoshangabad here a yadav's residents which is called Gwaltoli and there a beautiful temple of maa kali which is very famous because of its history and Hindu region.
Ek mukhi Dattatreya Mandir; Built by Pujaniya Rukmini Bai Jade and Shree Sita Ram Tembe siblings of Shri Vasudevananda Saraswati Swami Maharaj, also known as Tembe Swamy who was incarnation of Shri Guru Dev Datta. The campus also is samadhi place of pujaniya Rukmani Bai Jade. They established Ekmukhi Dattatreya idol on vasant panchami Tithi in 1926 with celebration. At this place Shri Loknath Tirth Swami Maharaj gave Sakhtipat dikhsha to Yogiraj Param Pujniya Gulavnikar Maharaj. This is a shrine Hindu temple having positive Vibes managed by Narmadapuram Maharashtrian Samaj.

Pachmarhi and Satpura Tiger Reserve 
Pachmarhi, the only hill station of Madhya Pradesh, and a pilgrimage site for Siva bhaktas from the surrounding countryside, is now the base for enjoying the natural riches of the Satpura Tiger Reserve as well. The tiger reserve encompasses the oldest forest reserve of India, the Bori Wildlife Sanctuary, and the breathtaking scenery of the Pachmarhi with the Satpura National Park. It was at Pachmarhi where Captain James Forsyth constructed the famous Bison Lodge and founded the Forest Department of Madhya Pradesh. His travelogue, 'The Central Indian Highlands', on his march from Jabalpur to Pachmarhi in 1861–62, transports one into the long lost times of tribal culture and rich wilderness.

Other attractions 
 Sethani Ghat
 Shreeramsharnam
 Khedapati Hanuman Mandir
 Ramji Baba Samadhi
 Pahadiya (Ancient rock carvings by Pandavas)
 Ancient Shani Mandir
 Hushang Shah Fort
 Bandrabhaan (Sangam of river Narmada and river Tawa)

Transport

Narmadapuram railway station is connected by rail with all major cities of the state. One of its tehsils, Itarsi is linked with all major cities of the country due to junction and being on central route of Indian Railways i.e. Delhi-Bombay route. Pachmarhi, the only hill station in the state of Madhya Pradesh and an administrative block of Hoshangabad district, can be reached by train from Itarsi until Pipariya and thereafter by bus, cab or personal vehicle or directly by bus or cab from Hoshangabad or even from cities like Bhopal and Indore. Hoshangabad district's biggest railway station is Itarsi which is connected to all major cities of India by train.

The nearest airport is Raja Bhoj Airport, Bhopal.

Education 
There are 960 primary schools, 207 Middle schools, 69 senior secondary schools and nine schools operated by Tribal Department. Many educational institutions including the Narmada MahaVidhyalaya (NMV) were established by prominent visionary late Pt. R L Sharma. There are 11 colleges and one is a polytechnic. All the colleges are affiliated to Barkatullah University, Bhopal. There is an office of Saksharta Programme which is running many literacy programs in the district.

Notable people
 Raj Chandra Bose - Mathematician
 Makhanlal Chaturvedi- Poet, writer, essayist and playwright
 Harishankar Parsai- Satirist and humorist of modern Hindi literature
 Praveen Morchhale - Filmmaker
 Manav Kaul- Actor

References

External links 
 About Narmadapuram Division
 Hoshanhabad Science Teaching Program (HSTP)
Official Website of Hoshangabad (Narmadapuram) District
Official Website of Jila Panchayat Hoshangabad

 
Cities and towns in Hoshangabad district
Cities in Madhya Pradesh